Chachiha is a village and gram panchayat in the tehsil of Joura, in the Morena district of the Indian state of Madhya Pradesh. In 2011 it had 2,053 inhabitants.

References

Villages in Morena district